Robert Edward Lee Wilson (March 5, 1865 – September 27, 1933) was the creator and owner of Lee Wilson and Company, a group of large cotton plantations in Mississippi County, Arkansas. Acquiring much of his father's former swamplands, Wilson formed a logging and farming business that would become one of the largest and most successful in the United States. Wilson founded many company towns for his workers, including Armorel, Marie, Victoria, and Wilson, and was one of the most influential Arkansans of his time. A period company brochure claims the Wilson & Company grounds to be the world's largest plantation.

References 

1865 births
1933 deaths
American city founders
American planters
Businesspeople from Arkansas
People from Mississippi County, Arkansas